Attila Miklósházy S.J. (5 April 1931 – 28 December 2018) was a Hungarian-born Canadian member of the Society of Jesus, and Bishop of the Hungarian Emigrants from 1989 to 2006.

In 1989, Pope John Paul II appointed Miklósházy as bishop responsible for the pastoral care of Hungarian emigrants, a position he held until his retirement in 2006.

References

1931 births
2018 deaths
People from Miskolc
20th-century Roman Catholic bishops in Canada
21st-century Roman Catholic bishops in Canada
Jesuit bishops
20th-century Canadian Jesuits
20th-century Hungarian Jesuits
Hungarian emigrants to Canada
Hungarian Roman Catholic bishops